Urraca Gomez (died c. 1039) was Countess of Castile through her marriage to Count Sancho Garcia of Castile. She was daughter of the count of Saldaña.

11th-century deaths
Spanish countesses
Year of birth unknown